Kansat is an Indian sweet from Malda, West Bengal, India. Kansat is made from chhena.

References

Sweets of West Bengal
Indian cuisine